Evan S. Prodromou (born 14 October 1968) is a software developer and open source advocate. His major contributions have been Wikitravel (with Michele Ann Jenkins), Identi.ca, and StatusNet. 

In 2015, he launched Fuzzy.ai, an artificial intelligence service for developers.

Biography 
Prodromou was born in Cincinnati, Ohio, United States, and grew up in Texas and California. He has lived in Amsterdam, San Francisco, and Lisbon, and currently lives in Montreal.

Prodromou graduated from University of California, Berkeley in 1990 (Physics, English), and worked for Microsoft and various Web development companies in the late 1990s. In 2003 he started Wikitravel, and in 2007 founded Control Yourself, which developed the software for Identi.ca, a microblogging service. Control Yourself was renamed to Laconica, StatusNet in 2010, and finally to GNU social in 2012. In December 2012 Prodromou started a new company, E14N.com, to develop a new social media platform, Pump.io.

Prodromou is an advocate of Free and Open Source Software and free culture. He  has presented at software conferences, and is the chair of the World Wide Web consortium's (W3C) Federated Social Web Community Group.
He also serves on the World Wide Web Consortium Social Web Working Group and he is a co-editor of ActivityPub, the W3C standard for decentralized social networking.

Evan is the son of Stav Prodromou, and is married to Michele Ann Jenkins. They have two children.

Projects 

Evan Prodromou is working on or has worked on these projects:
 fuzzy.ai
 Breather (company)
 Pump.io
 E14N.com (formerly Control Yourself, Laconica, and StatusNet)
 Identi.ca
 Wikitravel
 Vinismo
 kei.ki
 certifi.ca
 Heat.net

References

External links 
 Official website, archived 2016-08-18
 
 Evan Prodromou on Mastodon (social network)
 

1968 births
Living people
American computer programmers
Free software programmers
People from Cincinnati
American people of Greek descent